Tane or Tāne may refer to:

People
 Tane Ikai (1879–1995), a Japanese supercentenarian
 Tané Matsukata (1918–1989), founder of Nishimachi International School in Azabu, Tokyo
 Tané McClure (born 1958), an American singer and actress
 Tane Nikolov (1873–1947), a Bulgarian revolutionary
 Tane Norton (born 1942), a New Zealand rugby union player
 Tomoko Tane (born 1961), Japanese singer, songwriter and arranger
 Tane Topia (born 1976), a New Zealand former cricketer
 Tane Tu'ipulotu (born 1981), a former rugby union player

Places
 Tane (Bora Bora), a private island in the lagoon of Bora Bora
 Tane Province, an old province of Japan in the area of Kagoshima Prefecture

Other
 Tāne, the god of forests and of birds in Māori mythology
 Tāne Mahuta, a giant kauri tree in the Waipoua Forest
 Tane-rore, in Maori mythology is the personification of shimmering air as he performs a haka for his mother Hine-raumati.